Luangwa may refer to:
Luangwa River, the major river of eastern Zambia
Luangwa Bridge, which crosses the Luangwa River
Luangwa River (Mporokoso), a tributary of the Kalungwishi River in Mporokoso District, Zambia;
Luangwa, Zambia, a town in Zambia at the confluence of the Luangwa and Zambezi Rivers, and previously called Feira;
Luangwa District of eastern Lusaka Province, Zambia, of which Luangwa town is the headquarters;
South Luangwa National Park
North Luangwa National Park
Luangwa, a genus of cynodonts